Lawrence Park Historic District is a national historic district located at Bronxville, Westchester County, New York. The district contains 94 contributing buildings, the majority of which are architecturally or historically significant. Developed in the late nineteenth and early twentieth century on twenty acres of land closely associated with the historical evolution of the surrounding community, the area attracted as residents many prominent artists and writers of the period. The Park structures were built on a wooded hillside, along winding roads. While in close proximity to one another, they achieve a feeling of seclusion and privacy. Few of the houses have had major alterations, and today Lawrence Park retains much of its original character.

Lawrence Park was added to the National Register of Historic Places in 1980. The district is primarily residential and representative of early suburban growth outside New York City. Bordering Lawrence Park to the south and west is the commercial section of the Village of Bronxville, or village center, with Pondfield Road running down the center. Newer residential areas lie north and east of the district, sharply delineated by changes in terrain.

Significance

Lawrence Park Historic District is architecturally, historically, and culturally significant. William Van Duzer Lawrence, Lawrence Park's developer, personally oversaw the design and construction of the first homes in Lawrence Park and encouraged well-known artists and writers to make Lawrence Park their home, including artists Otto Henry Bacher, Hobart Nichols, and William Thomas Smedley, and writers Tudor Jenks, Kate Douglas Wiggin, Edmund Clarence Stedman, and Alice Wellington Rollins. Many of these residents were also prominent in the cultural, social, and political realm of the Village of Bronxville. In spite of intrusions and alterations to buildings within the district over time, the ambiance of Lawrence Park has not changed. Lawrence Park still retains the coherence and character of an architecturally distinctive turn-of-the-century suburban development.

History
The twenty acres now included in the boundaries of Lawrence Park, which is within the Village of Bronxville, Town of Eastchester, are a part of a large parcel of land deeded to Thomas Pell. Pell received it from four chiefs of the Mohican tribe — Gramatan, Annale, Wariatipus, and Wampage — and he in turn deeded it, in 1664, to ten families from Fairfield, Connecticut. Laws for the area were established in 1665 under an agreement called the Eastchester Covenant. This document, unusual for its time, made provisions for the education of children, the disposition and upkeep of property, the support of a minister, and the regulation of all public affairs.

During the eighteenth century a community began to grow because of the proximity of the Bronx River, a source of power and transportation. Pre-Revolutionary settlers included the Underhill family who originally owned much of the land in the west part of what is now the Village and operated a saw and grist mill on the river. From this family came the community's first name — Underhill's Crossing. In the 1820s, a vein of fine white marble was discovered in nearby Tuckahoe, attracting more people to the area. Underhill's Crossing's rapid development was stimulated by the arrival of the railroad in 1844. The former Underhill mill was purchased by James Swain, whose father-in-law, James Minot Prescott, bought farm land on Sunset Hill — 86 acres of the original Underhill holdings. Prescott built the Manor House on his land in 1845.

Lawrence Park was created by William Van Duzer Lawrence (1842-1927), who, in 1890, purchased the 86 acre Prescott farm, with the idea of subdivision and development. He commissioned  William A. Bates to design several houses on speculation. The first new houses in Lawrence Park were completed in 1891 and were built in a variety of revival styles including Colonial Revival, Classical Revival, Shingle and Tudor Revival.

Lawrence, who founded Bronxville's Sarah Lawrence College in 1928 in memory of his wife, had become a millionaire through astute business dealings in the pharmaceutical trade. Charmed by the rural character of a village only fifteen miles from New York City, he initially bought the land as a long-term property investment. A year later, however, he engaged an engineer to prepare maps, a necessary preliminary to putting buildings on the site. Lawrence took great personal care, as roads were surveyed and lots plotted, to protect the large trees and other natural features of the property. He then chose four of the most picturesque sites and hired the architect William A. Bates, who had just successfully completed a group of "cottages" at Tuxedo Park, to design four houses to be built on speculation.

Bates, born in 1853 in Michigan, came to New York City at the age of nineteen to train as an architect, while working as a draftsman in the offices of Herter Brothers. By 1880 his designs for houses were appearing in architectural journals around the country. An article in the May, 1970, issue the Bronxville Women's Club magazine "The Villager" states, "Bates belonged to...the school of architects who worked in what one writer terms the "High Victorian Picturesque Eclectic" manner, drawing details from French and Spanish Romanesque, late French Gothic, Victorian Gothic of Italian inspiration, sixteenth-century castles on the Loire, Second Empire Norman, even early Christian Syrian monuments. Bates' early work was said to be very English... But his Bronxville tower houses seem to be more French than English...the important thing is not the historical accuracy of the design but the architect's art in harmonizing whatever his fancy leads him to, with itself and with its surroundings."

The first four houses sold quickly and the new owners were in residence by June, 1891. Lawrence then had Bates renovate and modernize the Manor House, and it became an Inn. Rooms at the Manor House were available to prospective purchasers of Lawrence Park lots, to people who had bought land and wanted to stay nearby while their houses were being built; and to friends and guests of Lawrence Park residents. A second amenity for Park dwellers was the now-demolished Bates-designed Casino, used for meetings and social gatherings of all kinds. Interest in the Park was high, the Manor House was full, and Bates, under Lawrence's direction, continued to design. As the houses sold, it was found that the area was meeting a housing demand from artists and authors of New York City. Studios and libraries had to be added to existing houses and incorporated into the plans for new ones for artists such as William Henry Howe, Herman T. Schladermundt, William T. Smedley, a well-known illustrator and Otto Bacher.

With such a concentration of persons in the arts, it was not long before Lawrence Park acquired the reputation of being "an exclusive literary and artistic development." In 1896, Mrs. George Custer, widow of the general and interested in becoming part of this exclusive development, bought a lot and commissioned Bates to design the first of the two houses she eventually built in Lawrence Park.
Some of the houses Lawrence built were put up for political, not social or economic reasons. When he discovered that the taxes paid by Bronxville residents were being used by the Town of Eastchester to develop Tuckahoe, Lawrence recognized that Bronxville had to be incorporated to have its own government. In order to accomplish incorporation, the Village had to give evidence of three hundred people within its boundaries. Heads were counted, but the population was not sufficient; so in the winter of 1897 Lawrence built seven larger houses for big families that would require many servants. When the new homes had been sold, noses were again counted, and Bronxville was able to incorporate.

The great charm of the development lay primarily in the architecture of the houses and their relationship to the environment. In a 1904 article in Architectural Record, Theodore Tuttle stated "The houses belong where they are placed, as if they had grown there and were content to remain, and the general effect is tranquil refinement." These houses, taken as a group, today represent in practically unspoiled form all the major styles that were in fashion at the turn of the century. Romantic and fanciful, they were designed for a time of more leisurely living. "Among them are examples of the traditional half timber and stucco, the Colonial Revival, and the now famous 'Shingle Style,' which reflects the spirit, if not the letter, of Henry Hobson Richardson's Romanesque Revival. Translated into wood, Romanesque, which is essentially an architecture of stone, becomes picturesque, rambling, and varied. Its salient features are high roofs and high gables, often with half timbering, wide porches, and corner towers, all of which can be observed in various combinations in houses in Lawrence Park."

By 1901, a good number of the houses in the Park were completed. The greater portion were designed by Bates, whose "...designs were meant for country living, with their wood and stone constructions suited admirable to their lovely hillside settings. Strung along narrow winding roads and perched on rocky ledges, they offered their owners the advantage of privacy combined with great natural beauty." Bates' influence in Bronxville extended beyond the Park. He was responsible for the design of much of the commercial area of the Village, as well as the Mission style Hotel Gramatan, of which only the shopping arcade now remains, on which he collaborated with A.E. Barlow.

Residences

25 Prescott Avenue
Typical of the early homes built in the Park is the residence at 25 Prescott Avenue, built in 1891. The home was designed by Bates and serves as a fine example of the Shingle style with its undulating surfaces, diamond-paned fenestration, and gable roof. It was first acquired by Will Hicok Low, noted figure painter, muralist, and designer of stained glass. Low was a founder of the Society of American Artists and numbered among his friends Robert Louis Stevenson and Augustus St. Gaudens. A medallion of Stevenson, designed by St. Gaudens, is set into the fieldstone chimney breast of the studio that Low added to the house and shared with Charles Lewis Hinton, an illustrator and sculptor who designed the Lindbergh medal. The house was lived in continuously by artists until 1965.

26 Prescott Avenue
Located at 26 Prescott Avenue is "Oak Ridge Cottage", built in 1895 and designed by another important architect of the period, William Winthrop Kent. The former residence of William T. Smedley, a highly successful portrait painter who vied with John Singer Sargeant for commissions, the house is often referred to as "Owl House" because of the carved owl finial perched on the peak of the roof. Built on an east–west axis, all windows receive the sun. The huge pieces of stone in the lower part of the structure are said to have been quarried by men who were paid by the cubic foot. According to Tuttle in the Record, "Oak Ridge...while not the most pretentious in appearance, probably excites interest more than any other house in the park, and more firmly impresses itself on the mind. It is a beautiful structure, irregular and rambling, as it should be, but so well held together, withal, that it may be viewed and judged in its entirety." Smedley was elected to the National Academy in 1905. He maintained a studio in New York City and his home in Bronxville had two studios. In 1916 Smedley added a garage to the home which was one of the first to be built in Lawrence Park. Since his death in 1920, "Owl House" has been lived in by prominent writers, most recently Brendan Gill of the New Yorker.

12 Sunset Avenue
"Gray Arches" at 12 Sunset Avenue was designed by Bates and built in 1891. The house is sited on one of the highest points in Lawrence Park Historic District and derives its name from the unusual design of the stone work on the porch which rests solidly on an outcropping of granite, overlooking the valley. The house and its environment provide a prime example of how the natural landscape has been treated with reverence, giving the homes an organic compatibility with their wooded surroundings. In 1892 "Grey Arches" was the summer home of the Lawrence family, and during the winter of 1894, it was the home of Kate Douglas Wiggin, author of Rebecca of Sunnybrook Farm, who described it in her autobiography as "...a beautiful house."

28 Valley Road
At 28 Valley Road is the "Pacesetter House," designed by architect Henry Eggers in 1952. It was built on the site of the 1895 William Kent residence,  who designed the Bronxville Village Hall as well as several houses in the Park. The Kent House was in the Shingle style and the newer residence, which won the 1953 House Beautiful award is also constructed of shingles with the pitched roof and rambling lines of the surrounding neighborhood architecture. The original Kent barn was used as a garage and decorative motifs from the barn are a notable feature of the interior design of the Eggers house.

See also

National Register of Historic Places listings in southern Westchester County, New York

References

Bronxville, New York
Historic districts in Westchester County, New York
Neighborhoods in New York (state)
Houses on the National Register of Historic Places in New York (state)
Colonial Revival architecture in New York (state)
Neoclassical architecture in New York (state)
Tudor Revival architecture in New York (state)
Houses in Westchester County, New York
Historic districts on the National Register of Historic Places in New York (state)
National Register of Historic Places in Westchester County, New York